The Confederate Mothers Memorial is a public park at Skyline Drive and West 19th Street in Russellville, Arkansas. Near the junction of the two roads is a gravel parking lot, in which are three stone monuments, each one placed by a different Confederate veterans or memorial organization, with inscriptions honoring the mothers of the Confederacy.

History
Land for the park was donated in 1921 to the United Daughters of the Confederacy, and the monuments were dedicated that year.  Plans to further develop the park with other amenities have never been realized.  It is believed to be the only Confederate memorial of its type in the state.

The park was listed on the National Register of Historic Places in 1996.

See also

 List of Confederate monuments and memorials
 National Register of Historic Places listings in Pope County, Arkansas

References

1921 establishments in Arkansas
Buildings and structures completed in 1921
Buildings and structures in Russellville, Arkansas
Memorial parks
Monuments and memorials to women
Neoclassical architecture in Arkansas
Parks on the National Register of Historic Places in Arkansas
Protected areas of Pope County, Arkansas
United Daughters of the Confederacy monuments and memorials in Arkansas